{{Infobox football club season
| club     = Toronto FC II
| image    =
| fullname = 
| nickname = 
| founded  = 
| ground   = 
| capacity = 
| chairman = 
| chrtitle = 
|owner     = Maple Leaf Sports & Entertainment
| mgrtitle = Manager
| manager  = Mike Muñoz
| league   = USL League One
| league result = 7th
| cup1     = USL1 Playoffs
| cup1 result = Did Not Qualify

| league topscorer   = Garrett McLaughlin (8)
| season   = 2021
| prevseason = 2020
| nextseason = 2022
| website  = 
| highest attendance = 
| lowest attendance = 
| average attendance = 
| largest win = TOR 3–0 NCA (10/1)
| largest loss = GVL 3–0 TOR (9/3)
}}

The 2021 Toronto FC II season was the seventh season in the club's history and sixth in play. The club returned to competition in USL League One after withdrawing from the 2020 season due to the COVID-19 pandemic. Due to COVID-19 travel restrictions in Canada, Toronto FC II would begin the season playing home matches in the United States, playing their first three home matches at Grande Sports World
in Casa Grande, Arizona before relocating to Osceola Heritage Park in Kissimmee, Florida. They were able to return to playing home matches in Toronto on July 30.

Team Roster

 Coaching staff 

Competitions
 USL League One 

 Standings 

Match Results

Statistics
 Goals
{| class="wikitable sortable" style="width:60%; text-align:center"
!width=15|Rank
!width=15|Nation
!width=130|Player
!width=50|USL League One
!width=50|Playoffs
!width=50|Total
|-
|1||||Garrett McLaughlin|| 8 || – ||8|-
|2||||Paul Rothrock|| 4 || – ||4|-
|rowspan=3|3||||Themi Antonoglou|| 3 || – ||3|-
|||Antonio Carlini|| 3 || – ||3|-
|||Jayden Nelson|| 3 || – ||3|-
|rowspan=3|6||||Julian Altobelli|| 2 || – ||2|-
|||Luke Singh|| 2 || – ||2|-
|||Kobe Franklin|| 2 || – ||2|-
|rowspan=6|9||||Talen Maples|| 1 || – ||1|-
|||Jahkeele Marshall-Rutty|| 1 || – ||1|-
|||Noble Okello|| 1 || – ||1|-
|||Luca Petrasso|| 1 || – ||1|-
|||Kevin Politz|| 1 || – ||1|-
|||Kosi Thompson|| 1 || – ||1|-
|colspan="3"|Own goals 
| 1 || – || 1|- class="sortbottom"
! colspan="3"|Totals||34||0||34

 Shutouts 
{| class="wikitable sortable" style="width:60%; text-align:center"
!width=15|Rank
!width=15|Nation
!width=130|Player
!width=15|Pos.
!width=50|USL League One
!width=50|Playoffs
!width=50|Total
|-
|rowspan=2|1||||Andreas Vaikla|| GK || 2 || – ||2|-
|||Caleb Patterson-Sewell|| GK || 2 || – ||2|-
|3||||Kevin Silva|| GK || 1 || – ||1'''
|-
! colspan="4"|Totals||5||0||5

References

Toronto FC II seasons
Toronto FC II
Toronto FC II
Toronto FC II